The Cabinet of Sierra Leone is the chief executive body of the Republic of Sierra Leone. Cabinet members are nominated by the President and are then proceeded to the House of Parliament of Sierra Leone for confirmation or rejection by a majority vote by members of Parliament. The president has the constitutional power to dismiss a cabinet official at any time.

The current cabinet of Sierra Leone (2019–present)

Presidential staff

Sierra Leone embassies abroad
The ambassadors of Sierra Leone are the highest ranking diplomats that represent Sierra Leone, its citizens and interests in foreign countries or organizations like the United Nations, African Union and Ecowas. The ambassadors are part of the executive branch of the Government of Sierra Leone and they work directly under the supervision of the Sierra Leone Ministry of Foreign Affairs. The ambassadors are appointed by the President and are then proceeded to the House of Parliament for confirmation or rejection by a majority vote by members of Parliament.

Current ambassadors of Sierra Leone

References
http://www.thisissierraleone.com/sierra-leone-full-list-of-the-new-cabinet-ministers-jan-2013/
http://www.sierra-leone.org/cabinet.html

https://www.bloomberg.com/news/2014-08-30/ebola-in-fifth-country-as-sierra-leone-fires-health-chief.html

Government of Sierra Leone
Lists of government ministers
Sierra Leone
https://statehouse.gov.sl/presidential-cabinet/